Labastide-d'Anjou is a commune in the Aude department in the Occitania region in Southern France. In 2019, it had a population of 1,284.

Demographics

See also
Communes of the Aude department

References

Communes of Aude
Aude communes articles needing translation from French Wikipedia